The 1964 Grand Prix motorcycle racing season was the 16th F.I.M. Road Racing World Championship Grand Prix season. The season consisted of twelve Grand Prix races in six classes: 500cc, 350cc, 250cc, 125cc, 50cc and Sidecars 500cc. It began on 2 February, with United States Grand Prix and ended with Japanese Grand Prix on 1 November.

Season summary
Mike Hailwood sprinted to another 500 class win for MV Agusta, winning the first six races of the year and seven races overall. Honda's Jim Redman won all eight 350 class races against only token factory opposition.

The 250 class proved to be more difficult as Yamaha's Phil Read battled Redman all season long, with Read finally coming out on top, winning five races to Redman's three. Luigi Taveri won the 125 title for Honda while Suzuki's Hugh Anderson fought a season-long battle with Honda's Ralph Bryans to retain his 50cc crown.

1964 Grand Prix season calendar

† Non-championship race.

Standings

Scoring system
Points were awarded to the top six finishers in each race. Only the best of five races were counted in 50cc, 350cc and 500cc championships, best of six in 125cc and 250cc championships, while in the Sidecars, only the best of four races were counted.

500cc final standings

350cc Standings

250cc Standings

125cc Standings

50cc Standings

References
 Büla, Maurice & Schertenleib, Jean-Claude (2001). Continental Circus 1949-2000. Chronosports S.A. 

Grand Prix motorcycle racing seasons
Grand Prix motorcycle racing season